Siah Peleh-ye Olya (also Romanized as Sīāh Peleh-ye ‘Olyā) is a village in Mansuri Rural District, Homeyl District, Eslamabad-e Gharb County, Kermanshah Province, Iran. At the 2006 census, its population was 46, in 9 families.

References 

Populated places in Eslamabad-e Gharb County